SRIA may refer to: 

Samarinda International Airport
Societas Rosicruciana in Anglia